Borgeets are a collection of lyrical songs that are set to specific ragas but not necessarily to any tala.  These  songs, composed by Srimanta Sankardeva and Madhavdeva in the 15th-16th centuries, are used to begin prayer services in monasteries, e.g. Satra and Namghar associated with the Ekasarana Dharma; and they also belong to the repertoire of Music of Meghalaya outside the religious context. They are a lyrical strain that express the religious sentiments of the poets reacting to different situations, and differ from other lyrics associated with the Ekasarana Dharma.  Similar songs composed by others are not generally considered .

The first Borgeet was composed by Srimanta Sankardeva during his first pilgrimage at Badrikashram in c1488, which is contemporaneous to the birth of Dhrupad in the court of Man Singh Tomar (1486-1518) of Gwalior.
The Borgeets are written in Brajavali dialect that is distinct from the Brajabuli used in Orissa and Bengal—it is a language where Maithili inflections were added to Assamese vocables and poruniciations— created by Shankardev and Madhabdev.

Lyrics
The  are written in the  form of verse. The first pada, marked ,  works as a refrain and is repeated over the course of singing of the succeeding verses. In the last couplet, the name of the poet is generally mentioned.

The first borgeet, mana meri rama-caranahi lagu, was composed by the Sankardeva at Badrikashrama during his first pilgrimage. The language he used for all his  is Brajavali, an artificial Maithili-Assamese mix; though Madhavdeva used Brajavali very sparingly. Sankardeva composed about two hundred and forty , but a fire destroyed them all and only about thirty four of them could be retrieved from memory. Sankardeva, much saddened by this loss, gave up writing  and asked Madhavdeva to write them instead.

Madhavdeva composed more than two hundred , which focus mainly on the child-Krishna.

Music

The rhythm (tala), on the other hand, are not mentioned; and  need not be set to rhythm. Nevertheless, by convention tala is used when a borgeet is performed for an audience, or in a congregation, and in general specific ragas are associated with specific talas (e.g., Ashowari-raga with yati-maan; Kalyana-raga with khar-maan, etc.). The lightness that is associated with the khyal type of Indian classical music is absent, instead the music is closer to the Dhrupad style. The singing of a borgeet is preceded by raga diya or raga tana, the local term for alap, but unlike the syllables used in Khyal or Dhrupad, words like Rama, Hari, Govinda, etc. are used. Furthermore, raga diya is fixed as opposed to alap which is improvised.

The technique of Borgeet follows the Prabandhan Gana tradition which is contemporary to Dhrupad and Kriti of Hindustani and Carnatic music. In , there are Talas from eight matras to thirty-two matras, all comprising three parts of proportionate length, viz., Ga-man, Ghat and Cok. These Talas are different in structure, rhythmic pattern as well as playing style from the talas now played with Hindustani and Carnatic music. A few like Rupaka, Ektali, Yati, Bisam, etc. are mentioned not only in the Sangita Sastras like Sangita Ratnakara but also in Jayadeva’s Gita Govinda.

Style 
The  performance which is accompanied by Bortaal can be rendered in both morning and dusk. On occasions like Krishna Janmashtami, Doul, Bihu, death anniversaries (tithi) of religious preceptors including Sankardeva and Madhavdeva and during the whole month of Bhadra the performance of Borgeet is preceded by an orchestral recital of Khol, Taal, Negera (Percussion instrument) etc., which is variously referred to as Yora-prasanga, Khol-prasanga or Yogan-gowa. The orchestra comprises one or two pairs of Negera, Taal, Khols which are played in unison.

Contemporary uses
He was from the family of Satradhikars. He and his sister Nikunjalata Mahanta from the Gajala Satra were very well versed with this form.  were also used by Bhupen Hazarika, in movies, and popular singers like Zubeen Garg have released their renderings. Music director, Dony Hazarika has made a successful attempt to celebrate the Borgeet at the national level through his album, Bohnimaan...The folk flows.

Film critic and short film maker Utpal Datta made a short film on Borgeet, titled  (https://www.youtube.com/watch?v=V3I5qgXt9G4) under the banner Pohar Media. Anupam Hazarika has produced the film. All leading exponents and artists were assembled for the film. Dr. Birendra Nath Datta, leading Satriya scholar, music director, singer and folklorist has narrated the content of the film while singer Gunindra Nath Ozah, Tarali Sarma, Sarod player Tarun Kalita, violin player Manoj Baruah and Satriya dancer Prerona Bhuyan has participated in the film with their arts to express various shades of the aesthetics of Borgeet.

Music director Anurag Saikia is known for taking an initiative of syncing  to the symphonic orchestra.

Translations
 have been translated into Hindi by Devi Prasad Bagrodia.

See also 

 Vrindavani vastra
 Kirtan Ghosha
 Bhagavat of Sankardev
 Dihanaam

References

General sources

 

 
 

Music of Assam
Culture of Assam